Lake Bonavista is a neighbourhood in Southeast Calgary, Alberta, Canada. It is bounded by Anderson Road to the north, Macleod Trail to the west, Canyon Meadows Drive to the south, and Bow Bottom Trail to the east. The small community of Bonavista Downs resides in the northeast corner of the neighbourhood.

History
Lake Bonavista was developed by the Keith Construction company starting in 1967.  It was the first community in Canada to be built around a man-made lake, and served as a prototype for other lake communities in Calgary.

Two trailer courts were on the west side of Bonavista, north of the Avenida Shopping Centre, alongside Macleod Trail. One trailer court was relocated to Northeast Calgary in the late 1990s; the other was removed and the land was sold. The Bonavista Square shopping complex, Calgary Honda, Kramer Mazda and Hyundai Gallery, as well as two apartments, a retirement home, and an office building were built in its place, accessed by an extended Lake Fraser Drive, as well as an interchange, built at Anderson Road and Macleod Trail, in 2001. The Avenida shopping centre, opened in 1988, was built to cater to the increasing size of the neighbourhood. It includes an art gallery and assorted upmarket restaurants.

Demographics

Residents in this community had a median household income of $101,025 in 2005, and there were 4.4% low income residents living in the neighbourhood. In Bonavista Downs, the median household income was $81,761, and there were 8.4% low income residents living in the neighbourhood.

Amenities
Lake Bonavista Promenade is a small commercial development within Lake Bonavista that includes both retail space and professional offices. There is convenient access to shopping areas along Macleod Trail and in Southcentre Mall.

Fish Creek Park borders the community to the south, and provides a variety of outdoor recreation opportunities.

The Lake Bonavista Community Association (not to be confused with the homeowners association which maintains the lake) owns a community centre within the district. The centre includes two ice rinks, a gym, and a variety of multipurpose rooms.

There is also a City of Calgary ice rink, Frank McCool Arena, within the community.

Manmade Lakes

The area was originally flat treeless prairie with no distinctive natural features.  In order to make the area more attractive, Lake Bonavista, a  manmade lake, was constructed in 1968, with a portion of the earth excavated from the lake used to construct a  hill with a waterfall adjacent to the lake.  The lake and park provide a variety of year-round recreational opportunities for residents, including fishing, swimming, boating, tennis, skating, and tobogganing.  The Lake Bonavista Homeowners Association, membership of which is mandatory for homeowners in the area, provides for the upkeep of the lake and park.

The neighbourhood also contains a second manmade lake, Lake Bonaventure.  This  lake is only accessible from houses built directly around the lake itself.  Homeowners with access to Lake Bonaventure must pay their share of the upkeep on both Lake Bonavista and Lake Bonaventure.

Bonavista Downs residents share many of the amenities with Lake Bonavista, but they do not have access to the lakes and do not pay for their upkeep.

Education
Lake Bonavista is home to the following schools:
Lake Bonavista, Public Elementary
Andrew Sibbald, Public Elementary
Sam Livingston, Public Elementary
Nickle, Public Junior High
St. Boniface, Catholic Elementary
St. Bonaventure, Catholic Junior High

Churches
The following churches are located in Lake Bonavista:
Bonavista Baptist Church
Bonavista Church (formerly Bonavista Evangelical Missionary Church)
Holy Nativity Anglican Church
St. Bonaventure Church

Transit 
Lake Bonavista is served by Calgary Transit Bus Route 29 to the north, Route 35 in the middle, and Route 81 in the south. The Canyon Meadows CTrain Station serves Lake Bonavista.

Electoral districts
Lake Bonavista is part of the Calgary Southeast Federal Electoral District, the Calgary Fish Creek Provincial Riding, and Calgary Municipal Ward 14.

See also
List of neighbourhoods in Calgary

References

James Martin, Calgary - Secrets of the City Arsenal Pulp Press, 1999.  
Robert M. Stamp, Suburban Modern - Postwar Dreams in Calgary Touchwood Editions, 2004.

External links
Lake Bonavista Community Association
Bonavista Downs Community Association

Neighbourhoods in Calgary